Dario Sammartino (born April 5, 1987) is an Italian professional poker player from Naples. In 2019 he was runner-up to Hossein Ensan at the Main Event of the World Series of Poker.

Sammartino was taught to play 5-Card Draw poker by his father after his grandfather died. He later discovered Texas Hold'em around the time of the Moneymaker Boom.

Around 2005, Dario Sammartino started playing in Italy’s newly opened poker clubs. He also registered on PokerStars under the screen name “Madgenius87”. 

Prior to the 2019 Main Event he had live tournament earnings of more than $8 million and was second on Italy's all-time money list. His largest cash was a third-place finish at the $111,111 High Roller for One Drop at the 2017 WSOP, where he earned $1.6 million. Sammartino had eight WSOP final tables, including two in 2019, and finished 43rd in the 2017 Main Event.

Playing under the name "Secret_M0d3", Sammartino has won three Spring Championship of Online Poker events, including a $21,000 No Limit Hold'em high roller in May 2016 for $718,000. He also has 12 cashes on the European Poker Tour, making the final table of the Monte Carlo Grand Final in 2016 where he finished in eighth place. He finished fourth in the €100,000 High Roller at the 2015 Grand Final for $782,000 and third in a $25,000 High Roller at the 2017 PokerStars Caribbean Adventure for $542,000.

Sammartino made the final table of the Main Event at the 2019 WSOP in sixth chip position and got to heads-up with Ensan. On the 301st hand of the final table, he went all-in on the turn with straight and flush draws holding  but lost to the pocket kings of Ensan. Sammartino earned $6 million for his runner-up finish.

Away from poker, Sammartino runs a company named Rent, Sell, Cars that loans out Ferraris.

As of 2019, Sammartino's live tournament winnings are more than $14 million.

References

External links
Hendon Mob profile

1987 births
Living people
Italian poker players